The International Journal of Biological Macromolecules  is a peer-reviewed scientific journal covering research into chemical and biological aspects of all natural macromolecules. It publishes articles on the molecular structure of proteins, macromolecular carbohydrates, lignins, biological poly-acids, and nucleic acids.   It also includes biological activities and interactions, molecular associations, chemical and biological modifications, and functional properties as well as development of related model systems, structural including conformational studies, new analytical techniques, and relevant theoretical developments.

Abstracting and indexing 
The journal is abstracted and indexed in Elsevier BIOBASE, BIOSIS Previews, Current Contents/Life Sciences, EMBASE, EMBiology, FSTA, MEDLINE, Polymer Contents, Science Citation Index, and Scopus.

External links

Sample Articles 

1. Rasouli, H. (2018). Devil's hand conceals behind the obscure side of AgNPs: A letter to the editor. International journal of biological macromolecules.

Elsevier academic journals
Biochemistry journals
English-language journals
Publications established in 1979